Pennsylvania State Senate District 18 includes parts of Lehigh County and Northampton County. It is currently represented by Democrat Lisa Boscola.

District profile
The district includes the following areas:

Lehigh County

 Bethlehem (Lehigh County portion)

Northampton County

 Bangor
 Bethlehem (Northampton County portion)
 Bethlehem Township
 Easton
 East Bangor
 Forks Township
 Freemansburg
 Glendon
 Hellertown
 Lower Mount Bethel Township
 Lower Nazareth Township
 Lower Saucon Township
 Nazareth
 Palmer Township
 Pen Argyl
 Plainfield Township
 Portland
 Roseto
 Stockertown
 Tatamy
 Upper Mount Bethel Township
 Upper Nazareth Township
 Washington Township
 West Easton
 Williams Township
 Wilson
 Wind Gap

Senators

References

Pennsylvania Senate districts
Government of Lehigh County, Pennsylvania
Government of Northampton County, Pennsylvania